Carlos Alberto Raffo (April 10, 1926 – September 18, 2013) was an Argentine football striker who played international football for Ecuador. He had health conditions and died at a Hospital in Guayaquil, Ecuador at age of 87.

Club career

Born in Buenos Aires, Raffo started his playing career with Club Atlético Platense in Argentina. In 1952 he moved to Ecuador to play for Argentina de Quito (now Deportivo Quito). In 1954 he joined Emelec where he would play many seasons, scoring 132 goals. In his later years he played for Everest and 9 de Octubre.

Raffo is considered to be one of the greatest goalscorers in the history of the Ecuadorian football, but the precise number of goals he scored will probably never be known, due to poor record keeping in the early 1950s.

International career

Raffo played international football for Ecuador between 1959 and 1963, he scored 10 goals in 13 games for his adoptive country. He was the top scorer in the Copa América in 1963. He is the only Ecuador player ever to achieve this feat to date.

Honours

Topscorer in Copa América in 1963: 6 goals
Topscorer in Campeonato Ecuatoriano 1963

References

1926 births
2013 deaths
Footballers from Buenos Aires
Argentine emigrants to Ecuador
Association football forwards
Argentine footballers
Ecuadorian footballers
Ecuadorian Serie A players
Club Atlético Platense footballers
S.D. Quito footballers
C.S. Emelec footballers
C.D. Everest footballers
Expatriate footballers in Ecuador
Ecuador international footballers
C.D. Cuenca managers